Anyang is a prefecture-level city in the north of Henan, China and the former capital of the Shang Dynasty

Anyang or An Yang may also refer to:

China
Anyang County, Anyang, Henan
Anyang River, or Huan River, tributary of the Yellow River
Anyang, the name of Wang Ze's state during the Song dynasty
, Rui'an, Zhejiang

Towns
, subdivision of Du'an Yao Autonomous County, Guangxi
, subdivision of Yunyang District, Shiyan, Hubei

Townships
, subdivision of Ganzhou District, Zhangye, Gansu
, subdivision of Shunping County, Hebei
, subdivision of Chun'an County, Zhejiang

South Korea
Anyang, Gyeonggi

Other
USS Kimberly (DD-521), loaned to the Republic of China Navy in Taiwan as ROCS An Yang DD-18/DDG918, 1967–1999

See also
An Yang (born 1984), Chinese figure skater